Rapinoe is a surname. Notable people with the surname include twins:
 Megan Rapinoe (born 1985), American soccer player
 Rachael Rapinoe (born 1985), American former soccer player